|}

The Champion INH Flat Race is a Grade 1 National Hunt flat race in Ireland for amateur riders which is open to horses aged four to seven years. It is run at Punchestown over a distance of about 2 miles and ½ furlong (2 miles and 70 yards, or 3,283 metres), and it is scheduled to take place each year during the Punchestown Festival in late April or early May.

The event was sponsored by the bookmaker Paddy Power from 1999 to 2011, by betchronicle.com in 2012, Betdaq in 2013, attheraces from 2014 to 2016 and the Racing Post from 2017 to 2019. The current sponsor is Race and Stay. It was formerly open to horses aged four or older, but an upper age limit of seven was introduced in 2007.

The field usually includes horses which ran previously in the Champion Bumper at Cheltenham, and both races were won by Cousin Vinny in 2008. The feat was repeated the following year by Dunguib, but he was later disqualified from the Irish version after testing positive for a banned substance. Two other horses have won both races; Fayonagh in 2017 and Facile Vega in 2022.

Records
Leading jockey since 1992 (4 wins):
 Patrick Mullins - Cousin Vinny (2008), Lovethehigherlaw (2011), Bellshill (2015), Facile Vega (2022)

Leading trainer since 1992 (11 wins):
 Willie Mullins - Maringo (1995), Cousin Vinny (2008), Lovethehigherlaw (2011), Champagne Fever (2012), Shaneshill (2014), Bellshill (2015), Blow By Blow (2016), Tornado Flyer (2018), Colreevy (2019), Kilcruit (2021), Facile Vega (2022)

Winners since 1992
 All amateur jockeys.

See also
 Horse racing in Ireland
 List of Irish National Hunt races

References
 Racing Post:

 pedigreequery.com – Champion INH Flat Race – Punchestown.
 racenewsonline.co.uk – Racenews Archive (April 25, 2003).

National Hunt races in Ireland
National Hunt flat races
Punchestown Racecourse